Abbotsford Ferry railway station was a small railway station on the branch line from Galashiels to Selkirk railway station at Selkirk in the Scottish county of Selkirkshire.

The station was near Abbotsford House, formerly the residence of historical novelist and poet Sir Walter Scott.

See also
 List of places in the Scottish Borders
 List of places in Scotland

Footnotes

References

Sources
 Line diagram
 Abbotsford Ferry station on navigable 1946 O. S. map

Disused railway stations in the Scottish Borders
Former North British Railway stations
Railway stations in Great Britain opened in 1856
Railway stations in Great Britain closed in 1931
Melrose, Scottish Borders